Modern Lovers 88 is a studio album by American singer-songwriter Jonathan Richman and the Modern Lovers. Recorded and released in late 1987, it became Richman's final recording alongside a backing band credited as the Modern Lovers. After a period of frequent switches from one record company to another, he released Modern Lovers 88 through Rounder Records, where he remained until the mid-1990s.

Running just under half an hour, the album features a new lineup of the Modern Lovers as a trio, with Richman joined by guitarist Brennan Totten and drummer Johnny Avila. Totten also produced the album, his first of several such projects with Richman. The three musicians had toured live together for about a year before recording the album at a studio near Richman's home in Grass Valley, California. With its acoustic instrumentation and spare arrangements, the sound of Modern Lovers 88 reflects Richman's love of early 1960s rock and roll and extreme aversion to loud amplification.

Early reviews were generally positive, but its reputation among rock critics soon stagnated. Record guides often dismissed it as unremarkable, along with most of the rest of Richman's 1980s output. Nonetheless, the album has garnered a cult following and reappraisal from critics who view it as an overlooked highlight of Richman's discography. Win Butler of Arcade Fire called it "a real classic that I never heard of as a classic." For Record Store Day 2022, Craft Recordings reissued the album in a remastered 35th-anniversary edition. Richman scored a late-career debut on the Billboard charts when the reissue pushed Modern Lovers 88 to number 77 on Top Album Sales.

Background 

Modern Lovers 88 was Richman's final album featuring a backing band credited as "the Modern Lovers", but he had already been touring as a solo artist since 1978. After his 1986 album It's Time for Jonathan Richman and the Modern Lovers, he broke up the third lineup of the Modern Lovers. From that point onward, he preferred to work with a rotating cast of musicians on a more casual, fluid basis, rather than putting together a full backing band as a unit with a stable lineup.

In 1986, Richman began performing live shows accompanied by his recent acquaintance Brennan Totten. A few months after discovering Totten playing in a Northern California blues band, Richman walked into Totten's home one morning, unannounced, singing his song "The UFO Man". When he got to the chorus, Richman exclaimed, "Your turn! You sing!", and Totten—who had been busy feeding his daughter at the time of the interruption—sang along in response, as requested. Richman replied, "Oh, you can sing too," and exited the residence. He asked Totten to join the Modern Lovers a few days later. While touring throughout the United States and Europe in 1986–87, Richman and Totten were joined on a temporary basis by Richman's old friend and frequent collaborator Andy Paley.

By this time in his career, music journalists noted Richman had developed a tendency to switch to a new label on virtually every new album he made. His previous three albums had been distributed in the United States by as many different labels: Sire Records for Jonathan Sings! (1983), Twin/Tone for Rockin' and Romance (1985), and Upside for It's Time for Jonathan Richman and the Modern Lovers (1986). All three labels were associated with new wave music, and all three in turn had marketed Richman as "a nerdy new waver"—each time to little success. For Modern Lovers 88, he would switch labels once again—this time joining Rounder Records, a smaller American label with a niche specialization in folk music. In the United Kingdom, his last two albums had been distributed by Rough Trade. While he enjoyed the creative freedom Rough Trade had afforded him under the enthusiastic personal support of label head Geoff Travis, the company's financial doldrums meant they had done little to promote his music. He ended his relationship with Rough Trade before recording Modern Lovers 88.

Recording and release 
Modern Lovers 88 was recorded in the autumn of 1987 in Grass Valley, California, near where Richman lived at the time. The sessions lasted three days. Totten produced the album. Having practiced extensively on the road, the band took little time for rehearsal before the sessions. Their performances were captured live in the studio, and no overdubbing was done.

Though its release is often dated to 1988, Rounder Records issued the album in November 1987. Departing from his previous labels' tendency to lump his records in the "new wave" category, Rounder promoted him as "a quirky folkie", a persona more in line with his musical direction. To promote the album, Rounder issued "California Desert Party" (backed with "When Harpo Played His Harp") as a 7-inch single in Spain and released "Dancin' Late at Night" as a track on The Rounder CD Single, a mini-compilation also featuring recent songs by NRBQ, Têtes Noires, and Barrence Whitfield & the Savages. He would release another seven albums with Rounder before switching to Vapor Records for his 1996 album Surrender to Jonathan. The album was released on Demon Records in the UK and Stony Plain Records in Canada.

Despite being recorded and released in 1987, the album was titled Modern Lovers 88. When asked about the apparent chronological discrepancy, Richman commented: "We figured that would give it a longer shelf life." "If Richman were capable of irony," a critic wrote in Rolling Stone, "the album's title might seem tongue in cheek: the simple chord changes, bare-bones instrumentation and unsophisticated production are as un-up-to-date as any of Richman's works since 1976's hard-edged Modern Lovers." The title may have been intended as an allusion to the song "Rocket 88" (1951), one of the very earliest rock and roll records in history.

2022 reissue

By 2007, Modern Lovers 88 and most of Richman's other 1980s albums had been out of print for many years. On April 23, 2022, the label Craft Recordings reissued the album in a 35th-anniversary edition for Record Store Day. It was the latest in a series of reissues from Richman's Rounder Records back catalog. Pressed on sky-blue vinyl in an edition of 7,000 copies, the record was remastered by Kevin Gray using an all-analog process. The re-release sent Modern Lovers 88 to number 77 on Top Album Sales for the week of May 7, 2022, marking Richman's first-ever appearance on any Billboard chart.

Reception 

Reviews in the American press were generally favorable, though some expressed reservations. For Rolling Stone, David Handelman summed up Richman's preceding mid-1980s output as "spotty, but always with shining moments"; he expressed a similarly mixed reaction to Modern Lovers 88, finding some tracks "honest and winning" while others "wear thin fast". Creem reviewer Craig Zeller wrote that "a lot of these songs do coast on minor melodies and self-borrowings a little too often but—as usual—Jonathan's engaging manner pulls you in." In the Boston Globe, David Emerson likened Richman to "a sincere/silly cross between Wally Cleaver and Pee Wee Herman ... In Richman's world, familiar joys are to be praised and new ones explored. An artist in the process of maturing? Not really. A singer with heart who's not ashamed to still have fun? You bet."

Other American critics were less reserved with their praise. "Happily," wrote Spins Jim Daly, "Modern Lovers 88 finds Richman firmly back on track. The 11-song album can be compared to a picture drawn by a first-grader, which is then proudly brought home, and admired not for its technical acumen but for its purity of spirit." David Okamoto of the St. Petersburg Times compared it to "a sloppy finger-painting, where technique comes in second to the feelings being expressed", and said an open-minded listener would "discover that Modern Lovers 88 is just a warm, fun throwback to a simpler time, when music was nothing but a form of personal expression." Jim Zebora of the Record-Journal said the album showed Richman to be "one of rock's wonders" and highlighted the immediacy of his vocal performance, writing that "he's got guts to be so far out in front, unprotected by anything but his sincerity." In the Austin American-Statesman, James Nold Jr. praised Modern Lovers 88 for encapsulating what he saw as Richman's finest qualities as a performer and songwriter, which he felt overcame flaws like a lack of ambition or propensity for childishness:

Critical consensus among reviewers in the British press was also complimentary. Writing for Record Mirror, Ian Dickson said Richman "still hasn't grown up and, having grooved along to Modern Lovers 88, I hope he never will", while also claiming the songs to be "a lot more astute than you might imagine" in light of their sometimes juvenile subject matter. NMEs Len Brown detected "an original spring in his steps, a daft charm in his innocence" that he compared favorably to the late 1970s Modern Lovers lineup, and wrote, "There's something reassuring about Jonathan's prolonged adolescence, something we can all depend on; if he ever grew up it would be as disturbing as Morrissey taking up wind-surfing. For while the world gets older and uglier Jo-Jo gets simpler 'n' sweeter, younger all the time." Pete Clark at Hi-Fi News & Record Review wrote that "88 sees Richman further refining his muse, casting aside some of his more icky anthropomorphisms and descending still further into deep joy ... If there's a child in you waiting to get out, here's the 24-hour pass." A print advertisement for the album, run by Demon Records, quoted further plaudits published in City Limits and Melody Maker.

Retrospective appraisal

In record guides of 1990s and 2000s, rock critics often dismissed Modern Lovers 88 as just another album in a mid-career slump for Richman. The album received middling scores in The Rolling Stone Album Guide, the Spin Alternative Record Guide, and MusicHound Rock: The Essential Album Guide. Critics usually lumped it alongside his other 1980s records, which were glossed as lackluster, dated in style, or too eccentric for the uninitiated listener. None of the aforementioned guides differentiated the album from any of his other 1980s records, with the exception of the third edition of the Rolling Stone Album Guide, which dubiously noted the album's reputation as a comeback among Richman's cult following. Prolific rock critic Robert Christgau omitted the album altogether from his Record Guide: The '80s.

By contrast, AllMusic's Richie Unterberger deemed the album "one of his better '80s efforts," praising its stripped-down "summertime campfire feel" and singling out "I Love Hot Nights", "California Desert Party", and "Gail Loves Me" among the "best uptempo tunes" in Richman's catalog. In the New Trouser Press Record Guide, Ira Robbins praised it as a "magical" and "all-too-brief set" with songs that "convert the essential ingredients of '50s R&B into airy but exciting dance-rock as only the Modern Lovers can." Modern Lovers 88 received a highly favorable reassessment in the anthology Lost in the Grooves: Scram's Capricious Guide to the Music You Missed by critic Jacqueline Zahas, who said the album had become "stranded in his long catalog" but "reminds us that Jonathan's not just sweetness and whimsy, but a visionary, stubbornly working out his own unique brand of rock and roll." The editors of the Scram anthology went further, calling for a broad reappraisal of Richman's solo efforts from the period:

British music critic Alexis Petridis later referred to Modern Lovers 88 as one of the records from Richman's "80s purple patch". In 2018, NME included the album on a list of "100 cult albums to hear before you die" with a blurb written by Win Butler of Arcade Fire, who praised Richman's lyricism on songs such as "I Love Hot Nights".

Track listing

Personnel
Adapted from the original CD packaging, except where otherwise noted.
Jonathan Richman and the Modern Lovers
Jonathan Richman – lead vocals, guitar, saxophone
Brennan Totten – backing vocals, guitar, production
Johnny Avila – backing vocals, "drum"

Others
Paul Emery – engineer
Andy Paley – color photography
Barbara McHugh – black-and-white photography
Joanna Bodenweber – design

2022 reissue
Kevin Gray – mastering engineer

Notes

References

Sources

External links 
 
 Jonathan Richman and the Modern Lovers performing "When Harpo Played His Harp" live on Canadian TV, circa 1987
 
 

1987 albums
Jonathan Richman albums
Rounder Records albums
Demon Music Group albums
Stony Plain Records albums
Craft Recordings albums